HMS Curzon (K513) was a  of the British Royal Navy that served during World War II. The ship was transferred to the UK under Lend-Lease on 20 November 1943, and named after either Captain Henry Curzon, who commanded  at the First Battle of Groix (1795), or Captain Edward Curzon who commanded  at the Battle of Navarino (1827). There is official uncertainty about which is correct.

Service history

Curzon was attached to the 16th Escort Group, based at Sheerness, part of Nore Command, for coastal convoy escort duty. She was not involved in the Normandy landings on 6 June 1944, but afterwards escorted convoys to the invasion beaches.

Towards the end of 1944 Curzon became a Coastal Forces Control Frigate (CFCF), controlling a flotilla of Motor Torpedo Boats operating in the Channel and North Sea to counter the threat of enemy E-boats.

On the night of 22/23 December 1944, Curzon, the destroyer  and the sloop  were on patrol off Ostend when they engaged a group of mine-laying E-boats. Curzon sank S912 and damaged two others. On 14/15 January 1945 Curzon and the destroyer  were on patrol off Westkapelle, when a group of five E-boats fired on a convoy with long-range torpedoes, claiming two hits. Curzon and Cotswold attacked, scattering the enemy. At 01:27 on 17 January 1945 Curzon and Cotswold were patrolling off the Scheldt estuary when they made radar contact with two groups of E-Boats. Cotswold attacked the nearest group, while Curzon closed to within 3,000 yards of the other before opening fire. The enemy laid a smoke screen and retreated at high speed into shallow water. The E-boats regrouped and attempted another attack, but it was also repulsed.

Curzon was then refitted at Tilbury. Her 2-pounder "pom pom" bow chaser was removed, the two 20 mm Oerlikons mounted in front of the bridge were replaced with two single 40 mm Bofors, and splinter shields were fitted to her  guns.

After VE Day Curzon was refitted for service with the British Pacific Fleet, but this assignment was later cancelled, and she remained in home waters until returned to the U.S. Navy on 27 March 1946.

References

1943 ships
Ships built in Hingham, Massachusetts
Captain-class frigates
Buckley-class destroyer escorts
World War II frigates of the United Kingdom